Phrurotimpus borealis is a species of true spider in the family Phrurolithidae. It is found in North America.

References

Phrurolithidae
Articles created by Qbugbot
Spiders described in 1911